Zefyri is a suburb of Athens and former municipality in West Attica, Greece. Since the 2011 local government reform it is part of the municipality Fyli, of which it is a municipal unit. The municipal unit has an area of 1.400 km2.

Zefyri is situated near the northeastern end of the Aigaleo mountains. Its built-up area is continuous with those of the neighbouring suburbs Ano Liosia, Acharnes and Kamatero. The Motorway 6 passes through Zefyri, by the 440 m cut and cover Zefyri Tunnel. Zefyri is 2 km southeast of Ano Liosia, 2 km southwest of Acharnes and about 10 km north of Athens city centre. The old metric Piraeus–Patras railway and the new Athens Airport–Patras railway pass through Zefyri.

The earthquake of 7 September 1999 damaged some tens of homes.

Historical population

See also
List of municipalities of Attica

References

External links
Zefyri (in Greek)
Zefyri Primary school

Populated places in West Attica
Fyli